= Daulatpur Safan railway station =

Railway station in Pakistan

General information
- Coordinates: 26.505609°N 67.974754°E
- Owner: Ministry of Railways

Other information
- Station code: DPSN
Location

Daulatpur Safan railway station (Urdu: دولت پور سفان ریلوے اسٹیشن) is located on Tando Adam-Mehrabpur branch line in Pakistan.

== See also ==
- List of railway stations in Pakistan
- Pakistan Railways
